The 1942 Corpus Christi Naval Air Station Comets football team represented the United States Navy's Naval Air Station Corpus Christi during the 1942 college football season. The team compiled a 4–3–1 record and was ranked No. 10 among the service teams in a poll of 91 sports writers conducted by the Associated Press. Corpus Christi played four games against college teams from the Southwest Conference, including conference champion Texas, and four games against other service teams.

Marty Karow was the head coach. Notable players included: halfback George Franck, who was later inducted into the College Football Hall of Fame; end Billy Dewell, who played for the Chicago Cardinals before the war; and end Ed Frutig, who played for Michigan and the Green Bay Packers before the war. Frutig was selected as the right end on the 1942 All-Navy All-America football team.

"Ike" Kepford, who later shot down 17 enemy aircraft to become the Navy's leading flying ace, scored both of the Comets' touchdowns against Texas A&M, one on an interception return and the other on a pass reception.

Schedule

References

Corpus Christi Naval Air Station
Corpus Christi Naval Air Station Comets football
Corpus Christi Naval Air Station Comets football